Bahraini uprising may refer to:

 March Intifada, an uprising that broke out in Bahrain in 1965
 1990s uprising in Bahrain
 2011 Bahraini uprising
 Bahrain Tamarod (2013)